Ivan Gonta (died 1768) was one of the leaders of the Koliivshchyna, an armed rebellion of peasants and Ukrainian Cossacks against Bar confederation in the Polish–Lithuanian Commonwealth.

Born in Rożyszki (modern Rozsishky) near Uman' in Bracław Voivodship, Gonta served as a sotnik (captain) of Cossack household militia of Franciszek Salezy Potocki, the Voivode of Kiev, and commanded a small unit in the garrison of Uman since 1757. During the Koliivshchyna he was ordered to fight the approaching haidamaka forces of Maksym Zalizniak. Instead, he and his militia joined the rebels, and the joint forces captured and ravaged the town of Uman on June 21, 1768. In what became known as the Massacre of Uman, thousands of local Polish szlachta, Jews, Uniates and other people were slaughtered. After that, Gonta was proclaimed colonel and commanded the garrison of Uman.

When Gonta sent a detachment to spread rebellion into the Ottoman Empire, Catherine the Great, the Empress of Russia, dispatched a regiment of Don Cossacks fighting against Bar confederation to help Poland suppress the rebellion to prevent Ottomans from waging a war against Russia. The commander of the Russian unit, Guriev, made the rebels believe he was siding with them for the joint trip against Bar confederation and managed to capture approximately 900 of them without a single shot. After that, Ivan Gonta was handed over to the Poles and was tried for high treason. Sentenced to death by grand Crown Hetman Franciszek Ksawery Branicki, he was then executed in the village of Serby (modern Gontivka) in the Podolian Voivodship. As an added measure, his body was partitioned and nailed to gallows in 14 towns of Podolia.

Although largely non-notable during his life, after his death he became a hero of countless folk songs and legends that portrayed him as a hero and a martyr. He was immortalized in Taras Shevchenko's controversial epic poem Haidamaky though Gonta had never killed his Roman Catholic sons, because his wife and children were of Orthodox faith and in fact he had never initiated the massacre of Uman himself.

In popular culture 
 Taras Shevchenko's  epic poem «Haidamaky» dedicated to kolii including Gonta.

External links
 Ivan Gonta at Encyclopedia of Ukraine

References 

 

Cossack rebels
Zaporozhian Cossacks
18th-century Ukrainian people
1768 deaths
Year of birth unknown
People from Cherkasy Oblast
People from Bracław Voivodeship
Koliivshchyna